The men's discus throw event at the 2015 African Games was held on 13 September.

Results

References

Discus